Matthew Colburn II (born July 27, 1997) is an American football running back for the Philadelphia Stars of the United States Football League (USFL). He played college football at Wake Forest.

Early life and education
Colburn was born on July 27, 1997, and grew up in Irmo, South Carolina. He attended Dutch Fork High School and set schools records as a junior with 2,448 rushing yards and 40 touchdowns. As a senior, he ran for 1,705 yards and scored 24 touchdowns, being named the 2014 SC "Mr. Football."

Colburn initially committed to Louisville but was told shortly before signing day that the school had no room for him. He then signed with Wake Forest, declining offers from Marshall, Georgia Southern and Furman. In his debut against Elon, Colburn ran for 38 yards on 12 carries and scored his first career touchdown. He led the team with 51 yards against Florida State.

As a sophomore, Colburn led the team with 626 rushing yards. In a win against Delaware, he made a career-high 24 carries for 118 yards and scored a touchdown. He ran for 103 yards the following week, becoming the first player with back-to-back 100-yard rushing games at Wake Forest since 2011. In his junior year, Colburn placed first in the school with 904 yards rushing. He ran for 237 yards against Syracuse on November 11. He was named to the ESPN All-ACC Bowl team at the end of the season.

Colburn ran for 759 yards and scored five touchdowns as a senior, finishing his career sixth in team history with 2,528 yards rushing. Against Louisville, who had pulled his scholarship in 2015, Colburn ran for a career-high 243 yards and scored three touchdowns.

Professional career

Los Angeles Rams
After going unselected in the 2019 NFL Draft, Colburn was signed by the Los Angeles Rams as an undrafted free agent. He was waived at the final roster cuts on August 30.

New York Guardians
In 2020, Colburn was signed by the New York Guardians of the XFL. He played in just two games for the Guardians, making one rush attempt for six yards.

TSL Blues
Later in the year, he played for the Blues of The Spring League, gaining almost 200 yards in week two and in week three.

Toronto Argonauts
On February 15, Colburn was signed by the Toronto Argonauts of the Canadian Football League (CFL). He was released on July 20.

Philadelphia Stars
Colburn was selected in the 28th round of the 2022 USFL Draft by the Philadelphia Stars. In his first game for the Stars, he played as a backup and made nine rush attempts for 14 yards. He was placed on injured reserve on June 29, 2022. Colburn was given the 2022 USFL Sportsman of the Year Award, awarded to the one who shows the "best-exhibited excellence on the field and leadership to the community off the field."

Jacksonville Jaguars
On August 7, 2022, Colburn was signed by the Jacksonville Jaguars. He was waived on August 15.

Philadelphia Stars (second stint)
Colburn re-signed with the Philadelphia Stars on November 9, 2022.

Statistics

References

Further reading

1997 births
Living people
American football running backs
Players of American football from South Carolina
Wake Forest Demon Deacons football players
Los Angeles Rams players
New York Guardians players
The Spring League players
Toronto Argonauts players
Philadelphia Stars (2022) players
Jacksonville Jaguars players